The Basilica of Our Lady of Patronage is a small countryside church located in Wied il-Għasri, Malta.

The facade of the chapel has four pillars in the Doric style, which hold up the two-storey building. Two small bell towers (one old, and one built in 2004) house three bells between them. The Basilica has a cupola without a lantern.

The first church

The present site of the church was previously occupied by another as early as 1530, as documented by the historian Achille Ferris. This small chapel that was in place was dedicated to the Assumption of Mary and was built by the Cini family, the descendants of whom live in Żebbuġ.

In 1657, during a pastoral visit, the chapel was declared unfit for purpose, as it was unkempt and abandoned. The chapel was then rebuilt some time in the 18th century.

The second church
In 1656, Pope Alexander VII gave Mary the title of Our Lady of Patronage. This title was then declared a universal devotion by Pope Benedict XIII. There is evidence that the devotion spread to Gozo so much so that the new church built between 1737 and 1739 and consecrated on May 8, 1739, was dedicated to its present title.

The builder and financial sustainer was the Rev. Thomas Saliba, whose family still lives in the village of Għasri. A pastoral visit in 1744 described the church as a long hall with a roof resting on five arches. The door looked southwards and one altar was made of precious alabaster. The main altarpiece portrayed the Blessed Virgin wearing a mantle, with which she was covering a man. The altarpiece is still in use today and was painted by a local artist from Senglea.

Later on, the sacristy was added, as well as other works of art, and a benefice to support the maintenance of the chapel.

The third church
By 1750, the area surrounding the church was becoming more populated, and the chapel itself was place of pilgrimage. Thus, Rev. Saliba requested that the Grandmaster of the Order of St John give him a larger piece of land on which a bigger church could be built. The document granting him permission was received in March 1752. The new building was consecrated on 5 October 1754, while the present altar was consecrated by H.E. Vincenzo Labini in 1789.

Minor basilica
The church of Our Lady of Patronage was elevated to dignity of minor basilica, and affiliated with Santa Maria Maggiore by Pope Clement XIII in 1768. This made the church the first basilica in Gozo.

Confirmation of this was given on March 7, 2004, after research in the Vatican Archives by the then-rector the Rev. Mgr Joseph Zammit.

In 1872, the area was raised to vice-parish (under the parish of Żebbuġto better administer to the pastoral needs of the people. The chapel served as vice parish church until a new parish was established in 1921 with the newly built church serving as parish church.

List of rectors

References

Basilica churches in Malta
Għasri